Gordon Gill Wilson (18 June 1904 – 1947) was an English footballer who played in the Football League for Barrow, Hull City, Luton Town and Norwich City.

References

1904 births
1947 deaths
English footballers
Association football defenders
English Football League players
Middlesbrough F.C. players
West Auckland Town F.C. players
Hull City A.F.C. players
Luton Town F.C. players
Norwich City F.C. players
Barrow A.F.C. players
Linfield F.C. players